The Isle of Wight Festival 2003 was the second revived Isle of Wight Festival to take place on the Seaclose Park site in Newport on the Isle of Wight. It was the first to take place on the second weekend in June, which would be then set as the Festival's annual date.

A follow-up to Rock Island 2002, the event was taken over by promoters 'Solo' and was thus the first curated by John Giddings. Camping facilities near the site were increased, available from Thursday to Monday. Attendance was around 14,000.

Line-up

Main stage

Starsailor was the first band to return to the revived festival. They would appear again in 2005 and 2008.

Weekend Tickets cost £50.

References

External links
 Official Isle of Wight Festival Website – isleofwightfestival.com

2003
2003 in British music
2003 in England
21st century on the Isle of Wight